Beta Disk Interface is a disk interface for ZX Spectrum computers. It was developed by Technology Research Ltd. (United Kingdom), in 1984 and released in 1985 with price £109.25 (or £249.75 with one disk drive). Beta 128 Disk Interface is a 1987 version supporting ZX Spectrum 128 machines (difference is in access points addresses). Beta disk interfaces were distributed with TR-DOS operating system in ROM, also attributed to Technology Research Ltd. Latest firmware version is 5.03 (1986).
The interface was based on the WD1793 chip.

The interface handles single and double sided, 40 and 80 track double density floppy disks, up to 4 drives.

Clones
This interface was popular for its simplicity, and the Beta 128 Disk Interface was cloned all around the USSR. The first known USSR clones were ones produced by НПВО "Вариант" (NPVO "Variant", Leningrad) in 1989. Beta 128 schematics are included in various Russian ZX Spectrum clones.

Some variants of schematics support only 2 drives. Phase correction of the drive data signal is made in different ways.

In the years 2018–2021, clones were produced in the Czech Republic with the names: Beta Disk 128C, 128X and 128 mini.

Operating systems support

 TR-DOS
 iS-DOS
 CP/M (various hack versions)
 DNA OS

See also
 DISCiPLE
 MB02

References

External links

 Virtual TR-DOS

ZX Spectrum
Computer storage devices